Pseudotothyris is a genus of armored catfishes native to South America.

Taxonomy
Within the tribe Otothyrini, Pseudotothyris has a sister group relationship with Otothyris. In turn, Otothyropsis has a sister group relationship with the clade Otothyris plus Pseudotothyris. These three genera and Schizolecis share unique specializations of the cranium associated with an enlarged swimbladder capsule. The degree of development of the swimbladder capsule in these genera was not found in any other member of the Otothyrini.

Species
There are currently 3 recognized species in this genus:
 Pseudotothyris ignota Martins, Britski & Langeani, 2014 
 Pseudotothyris janeirensis Britski & Garavello, 1984
 Pseudotothyris obtusa Miranda-Ribeiro, 1911

References

Otothyrinae
Taxa named by Heraldo Antonio Britski
Taxa named by Júlio César Garavello
Fish of South America
Catfish genera
Freshwater fish genera